Russian Machism (//) was a term applied to a variety of political/philosophical viewpoints which emerged in Imperial Russia in the beginning of the twentieth century before the Russian Revolution. They shared an interest in the scientific and philosophical insights of Ernst Mach. Many, but not all, of the Russian Machists were Marxists, and some viewed Machism as an essential ingredient of a materialist outlook on the world. The term came into use around 1905, primarily as a polemical expression used by Lenin and Georgi Plekhanov. With a shared desire to defend an "orthodox" account of Marxism, from their differing perspective they both divided the opponents of this putative orthodoxy into the "idealists" and the "Machists". The term remained a signifier of Marxist-Leninist opprobrium from the 1920s through into the 1970s. This was shown by Alexander Maximov use of the term to criticise Boris Hessen in 1928. It can also be seen in Evald Ilyenkov's chapter on "Marxism against Machism as the Philosophy of Lifeless Reaction" in Leninist Dialectics and the Metaphysics of Positivism (1979).

Confrontation with idealism
In 1902 Pavel Ivanovich Novgorodtsev edited the book Problems of Idealism (Problemy Idealizma) which included contributions from Sergei Bulgakov, Evgenii Nikolaevitch Troubetzkoy, Sergei Nikolaevich Trubetskoy, Peter Berngardovich Struve, Nikolai Berdyaev, Semyon Frank, Sergei Askol'dov, Bogdan Kistyakovski, Alexander Sergeyevich Lappo-Danilevsky, Sergey Oldenburg, and Zhukovsky. In proclaiming the advent of a new idealist movement he also derided positivism as being narrow and dogmatic.

Confrontation with Lenin
The publication of Studies in the Philosophy of Marxism (Russian: Очерки по философии Марксизма) in 1908 marked a key moment in the emergence of this viewpoint. However whilst many of the proponents of Russian Machism saw it as adding important insights to what a materialist view of the world would look like, Vladimir Lenin was a consistent opponent; he cited as such: Bazasov, Bogdanov, Lunacharski, Berman, Gelfond, Yushkevich, Sergei Suvorov and Nikolai Valentinov.

Prominent Russian "Machists"
This list includes people who at one time or other have been described as Russian Machists:
Vladimir Bazarov
Jakov Berman
Alexander Bogdanov
Osip Gelfond
Boris Hessen 
Sergei Suvorov
Nikolai Valentinov
Pavel Yushkevich

See also
 Materialism and Empirio-criticism
 Positivism in Poland

Further reading
 Steila, Daniela. Nauka i revoljucija. Recepciia empiriokriticizma v russkoi kul'ture (1877-1910 gg.). Moscow: Akademicheskii Proekt, 2013. Originally published in Italian

References

Russian philosophy